Jerry Kobza (born March 18, 1969) is a USAC and CRSA driver in the open-wheel ranks of racing, collecting a handful of championships. In 1999, he made his only career NASCAR Craftsman Truck Series start, which came for Team Racing at Memphis Motorsports Park. He qualified the truck in 34th position, but ended in 35th place with engine problems.

Kobza is from Sacramento, California.

Motorsports career results

NASCAR

Craftsman Truck Series

References

External links
 

1969 births
NASCAR drivers
Living people
Racing drivers from Sacramento, California